Utah is a populated location  in Dearborn County, Indiana, in the United States.

History
It was likely named in commemoration of the Utah Territory.

References

Populated places in Dearborn County, Indiana